The Morocco Tennis Tour – Marrakech is a professional tennis tournament played on outdoor red clay courts. It is currently part of the Association of Tennis Professionals (ATP) Challenger Tour. It is held annually in Marrakech, Morocco, since 2007.

Past finals

Singles

Doubles

External links
Morocco Tennis Tour official website
ITF search

 
ATP Challenger Tour
Clay court tennis tournaments
Tennis tournaments in Morocco